Eutrichocampa is a genus of two-pronged bristletails in the family Campodeidae. There are about six described species in Eutrichocampa.

Species
These six species belong to the genus Eutrichocampa:
 Eutrichocampa aegea Silvestri, 1932 g
 Eutrichocampa collina Ionescu, 1955 g
 Eutrichocampa helvetica Wygodzinski, 1941 g
 Eutrichocampa hispanica Silvestri, 1932 g
 Eutrichocampa remyi Conde, 1947 g
 Eutrichocampa thamugadensis Condé, 1948 g
Data sources: i = ITIS, c = Catalogue of Life, g = GBIF, b = Bugguide.net

References

Further reading

 
 
 

Diplura